Bussières is a surname. It may also refer to the following communes in France:

 Bussières, Côte-d'Or, in the Côte-d'Or department
 Bussières, Loire, in the Loire department
 Bussières, Puy-de-Dôme, in the Puy-de-Dôme department
 Bussières, Haute-Saône, in the Haute-Saône department
 Bussières, Saône-et-Loire, in the Saône-et-Loire department
 Bussières, Seine-et-Marne, in the Seine-et-Marne department
 Bussières, Yonne, in the Yonne department
 Bussières-et-Pruns, in the Puy-de-Dôme department
 Chambley-Bussières, in the Meurthe-et-Moselle department

See also
Bussière (disambiguation)
La Bussière (disambiguation)